The Ministry of the Navy was a former government ministry in Turkey. During the first two governments of Turkey the naval affairs were managed by a directorate. But on 22 November 1924 during the formation of the 3rd government of Turkey a new ministry was  established for the naval affairs. However soon the ministry was blamed for a chain of accidents  during the maintenance of the battle cruiser Yavuz. The minister was put on trial and the ministry was abolished at the end of the 4th government of Turkey on 1 November 1927. The responsibility of the ministry was transferred to the Ministry of National Defense.

Aftermath
On 6 July 2011, during the formation of the 61st government of Turkey the name of the ministry of Transport and Communication was changed to Ministry of Transport, Maritime Affairs and Communication, but this ministry is responsible only in civilian maritime affairs.

Ministers of the Navy

References

1924 establishments in Turkey
1927 disestablishments in Turkey
Navy 
Turkish Naval Forces
Ministries established in 1924
Ministries disestablished in 1927